Events in the year 1925 in Turkey.

Parliament
 2nd Parliament of Turkey

Incumbents
President – Kemal Atatürk
Prime Minister 
Fethi Okyar (up to 3 March)
 İsmet İnönü (from 3 March)
 Leader of the opposition – Kazım Karabekir (up to 5 June)

Ruling party and the main opposition
 Ruling party – Republican People's Party (CHP)
Main opposition – Progressive Republican Party (TCF) (up to 3 June)

Cabinet
3rd government of Turkey (up to 3 March)
4th government of Turkey (from 3 March)

Events
1 January –Turkey gained the right of duty tax (according to the treaty of Lausanne)
11 February – Beginning of Sheikh Said rebellion
17 February – Tax of Ashar ended. An important reform in the daily lives of the villagers
24 February – The rebels captured Elazığ 
26 February – End of the Regie Company. An important step in the economics
3 March – Fetkhi Okyar’s cabinet which was ineffective against the rebellion was replaced by İsmet İnönü's new cabinet
4 March – Independence Tribunals
8 March – Rebels were defeated around Diyarbakır
12 April – Sheikh Said was arrested
1 May – Earthquake in Adana
3 June – Independence Tribunal closed the Progressive Republican Party 
5 August – Atatürk and Latife Hanım (Latife Uşakizade) were divorced
 25 August – In Kastamonu Atatürk made a speech on traditional costume and expressed his preference for western style hat
4 September – First ball in which Muslim women attended
25 November – The Hat reform  
30 November – Tekkes, traditional institutions were closed

Births
11 March – İlhan Selçuk, journalist
5 April – Sadri Alışık, actor
28 May – Bülent Ecevit, journalist, prime minister (37th, 40th ,42nd, 56th, and  57th government of Turkey) 
1 June – İdris Küçükömer, academic and philosopher
15 June – Atilla İlhan, poet
6 July – Gazi Yaşargil, MD ( neurosurgeon)
15 August – Münir Özkul, theatre actor
28 September – Ali Bozer, lawyer, politician
9 December – Atıf Yılmaz, film director
22 December – Lefter Küçükandonyadis, footballer (of Greek origin)

Deaths
14 February – Halit Pasha (born in 1883), general, politician (killed) 
12 March – Hüseyin Ferit Törümküney (born in 1878), bureaucrat, politician
29 June – Şeyh Said (born in 1865), rebel leader (executed)
18 December – Süleyman Sırrı Aral (born in 1874), engineer, politician

Gallery

References

 
Years of the 20th century in Turkey
Turkey
Turkey
Turkey